Lukas Hofer (born 30 September 1989) is an Italian biathlete.

Career
Hofer competed for Italy at the 2010 Winter Olympics in biathlon. Together with Karin Oberhofer, Dorothea Wierer and Dominik Windisch he won a bronze medal in the Mixed relay at the 2014 Winter Olympics, in Sochi, Russia. Then four years later at the 2018 Winter Olympics in Pyeongchang County, South Korea together with Lisa Vittozzi, Dorothea Wierer and Dominik Windisch, he once again won a bronze medal in the Mixed relay.

Further notable results
 2007: 3rd, Italian Biathlon Championships, sprint
 2008: 1st, Italian Biathlon Championships, mass start
 2009: 3rd, Italian Biathlon Championships, mass start
 2011:
 1st, Italian Biathlon Championships, sprint
 1st, Italian Biathlon Championships, mass start
 2012:
 3rd, Italian Biathlon Championships, sprint
 3rd, Italian Biathlon Championships, pursuit

Biathlon results
All results are sourced from the International Biathlon Union.

Olympic Games
2 medals (2 bronze medals)

World Championships
4 medals (2 silver, 2 bronze)

*During Olympic seasons competitions are only held for those events not included in the Olympic program.
**The single mixed relay was added as an event in 2019.

Junior/Youth World Championships

Individual victories
2 victory (2 Sp) 

*Results are from IBU races which include the Biathlon World Cup, Biathlon World Championships and the Winter Olympic Games.

References

External links

Italian male biathletes
Olympic biathletes of Italy
Biathletes at the 2010 Winter Olympics
Biathletes at the 2014 Winter Olympics
Biathletes at the 2018 Winter Olympics
Biathletes at the 2022 Winter Olympics
Germanophone Italian people
1989 births
Living people
Sportspeople from Bruneck
Biathlon World Championships medalists
Medalists at the 2014 Winter Olympics
Medalists at the 2018 Winter Olympics
Olympic bronze medalists for Italy
Olympic medalists in biathlon
Cross-country skiers of Centro Sportivo Carabinieri